This article lists described species of the family Asilidae start with letter Y.

A
B
C
D
E
F
G
H
I
J
K
L
M
N
O
P
Q
R
S
T
U
V
W
Y
Z

List of Species

Genus Yksdarhus
 Yksdarhus lyneborgi (Hradský & Hüttinger, 1983)

References 

 
Asilidae